Grant Township is a township in Dickinson County, Kansas, USA.  As of the 2000 census, its population was 918.

Geography
According to the USGS, it contains one cemetery, Saint Joseph.

The streams of Holland Creek, Mud Creek and Turkey Creek run through this township.

Transportation
Grant Township contains one airport or landing strip, Wright Airpark.

Further reading

References

 USGS Geographic Names Information System (GNIS)

External links
 City-Data.com

Townships in Dickinson County, Kansas
Townships in Kansas